The Cape Town International Jazz Festival is an annual music festival held in Cape Town, South Africa. The first one was held in 2000 to 2005 and is recognized as the fourth largest jazz festival in the world and the largest jazz festival on the African continent. The festival was called the "Cape Town North Sea Jazz Festival" due to its association with the North Sea Jazz Festival in the Netherlands.

History

The Cape Town International Jazz Festival started in 2000 as part of the North Sea Jazz Festival. This was part of an arrangement that came about as a result of the partnership between espAfrika (a South African events management company founded by Rashid Lombard) and Mojo Concerts BV, the founders of the Dutch North Sea Jazz Festival. It was the first time that a jazz festival with four simultaneous legs took place in South Africa. The festival occurred ever year until 2005 as the North Sea Jazz Festival. Thereafter, from 2005 onwards, the festival was renamed to the Cape Town International Jazz Festival due to the partnership failing. The festival has grown since it first started in 2000, and as a result, attendance has also grown from 14,000 concert goers in 2000 to 34,000 concert goers in 2013. From its inception to 2003, the event was held at the Good Hope Centre but it outgrew the venue, so from 2004, the festival has since been hosted at the Cape Town International Convention Centre.

Lawsuit
In 2000, the North Sea Jazz Festival came to Cape Town, South Africa for the first time. From 2000 to 2005, the festival was marketed as the North Sea Jazz Festival as part of a contract between espAfrika and Mojo Concerts. The plan was for Mojo Concerts to provide the necessary infrastructure for a world class African Jazz Festival, so as soon as that happened, Mojo Concerts took espAfrika to court. They filed for espAfrika's liquidation to consolidate a €500,000 debt that had been incurred over the 5-year contract. On 26 April 2005, a settlement was reached outside of court in which the debt was consolidated and espAfrika was able to continue with the festival, now under the name of the "Cape Town International Jazz Festival".

Previous festivals
The 2007 edition of the festival was endorsed by then Cape Town's Mayor Helen Zille. The 2010 edition of the festival contributed R 740 million to the Western Cape's GDP. For an extra R25.00 per show, music enthusiasts gain access to the Rosies Stage which features more relaxed, acoustic Jazz Music. Every year just before the main event, a free open-air concert with selected performers is held at the Greenmarket Square.

References

External links
 Official site

Jazz festivals in South Africa
Festivals in Cape Town
Recurring events established in 2000
2000 establishments in South Africa
Autumn events in South Africa